Orris may refer to:

People 
Peter Orris
Orris C. Herfindahl
Orris Pratt

Places 

Adam Orris House
Orris Baragwanath Pass

Other uses 
Orris root
Orris oil